Favositida is an extinct suborder of prehistoric corals in the order Tabulata.

References

External links 
 

Prehistoric animal suborders
Tabulata